The men's doubles table tennis event was part of the table tennis programme and took place between 29 and 31 May, at the Waseda University Gymnasium. 14 teams from 7 nations entered for the tournament, teams from the same NOC would not face each other before the final.

South Vietnam won the gold medal after beating Republic of China (Taiwan) 21–23, 21–17, 21–19, 21–16 in the final.

Schedule
All times are Japan Standard Time (UTC+09:00)

Results
Legend
WO — Won by walkover

References

 Official Report

External links
ITTF Database

Table tennis at the 1958 Asian Games